Pohlia nutans, the nodding thread-moss, is a species of moss in the family Mniaceae. It has a Cosmopolitan distribution, found on all seven continents; Europe, Iceland, Siberia, Japan, North America, Greenland, the Andes of South America, South Africa, Tasmania and nearby mainland Australia, New Zealand, and the Antarctic Peninsula and Mount Rittmann in Antarctica. An extremophile, it is resistant to cold, drought, salt, acid, heavy metals, and intense UV radiation.

Pohlia nutans is subject to fungal infections which cause fairy rings to appear. Some causative agents have been identified, including species of Cladosporium, Mortierella gamsii and Mortierella fimbricystis.

Subtaxa
The following subtaxa are accepted:
Pohlia nutans subsp. nutans 
Pohlia nutans subsp. otaruensis 
Pohlia nutans subsp. schimperi 
Pohlia nutans f. angustiretis 
Pohlia nutans f. arenaria 
Pohlia nutans f. brevicuspidata 
Pohlia nutans f. bryoides 
Pohlia nutans f. compacta 
Pohlia nutans f. cuspidatulum 
Pohlia nutans f. decurtata 
Pohlia nutans f. flagellata 
Pohlia nutans f. gemmiclada 
Pohlia nutans f. inclinata 
Pohlia nutans f. laxa 
Pohlia nutans f. longicuspidata 
Pohlia nutans f. microspora 
Pohlia nutans f. mollis 
Pohlia nutans f. nutans
Pohlia nutans f. patula 
Pohlia nutans f. pehrii 
Pohlia nutans f. prolifera 
Pohlia nutans f. pseudocucullata 
Pohlia nutans f. purpurascens 
Pohlia nutans f. ramosissima 
Pohlia nutans f. robusta 
Pohlia nutans f. saltans 
Pohlia nutans f. stollei 
Pohlia nutans f. teres

References

Mniaceae
Cosmopolitan species
Plants described in 1879